"Wildwood Flower" (or "The Wildwood Flower") is an American song, best known through performances and recordings by the Carter Family. It is a folk song, cataloged as Roud Folk Song Index No. 757.

History 

"Wildwood Flower" is a variant of the song "I'll Twine 'Mid the Ringlets", published in 1860 by composer Joseph Philbrick Webster, who wrote the music, with lyrics attributed to Maud Irving. Other versions of the song have evolved, including "The Pale Amaranthus" (collected in Kentucky and North Carolina, reported in 1911), "Raven Black Hair" and "The Pale Wildwood Flower" (collected 1915–1919), and "The Frail Wildwood Flower".

The original Carter Family first recorded "Wildwood Flower" in 1928 on the Victor label. Maybelle Carter leads a rendition of the song on the 1972 album Will the Circle be Unbroken, and frequently performed the song in concert with Johnny Cash and on his The Johnny Cash Show. The Carter version of the song is considered the premier example of "the Carter Scratch", a form of acoustic guitar playing in which the musician (in the case of the Carters, most notably Maybelle herself) plays both the melody and rhythm lines simultaneously.

Woody Guthrie used the tune of "I'll Twine 'Mid the Ringlets" for the verses of his song "The Sinking of the Reuben James", although he added a chorus to the song.

The original poem (if any) from which the lyrics derived has been lost. Other poems attributed to the reputed author of the lyrics, Maud Irving, may be found in periodicals of the time, including Godey's Lady's Book and Home Monthly. Several of the poems in the latter periodical carry bylines indicating that the Maud Irving of those poems was a pseudonym for poet and spiritualist J. William Van Namee.

Lyrics 
The original lyrics to the 1860 song "I'll Twine 'Mid the Ringlets", taken verbatim from the published sheet music (italics, recognized punctuation, and capitalization as in the original), are as follows.

Evolution 
Although originally a parlor song, the song had undergone the folk process by the time the Carter Family recorded it. For example, the first verse of "I'll Twine 'Mid the Ringlets" is

whereas the Carter Family's "Wildwood Flower" begins

In some versions, the order of the verses is changed, with the one ending in

moved to the end, thus giving the impression that the woman has come to terms with her lost love and can move on.

However, the final verse as originally written,

clearly shows that the woman remains heartbroken, and thus preserves the sad, tragic nature of the song, rather than ending on an upbeat, but ultimately false note.

Notes

Parlor songs
American folk songs
Carter Family songs
Roy Clark songs
Hank Thompson (musician) songs
Merle Travis songs
Joan Baez songs
Woody Guthrie songs
1860 songs
Songs written by Joseph Philbrick Webster
United States National Recording Registry recordings